Isaiah Wrigley Lees (December 25, 1830 – December 21, 1902) was the Chief of Police of San Francisco.

Biography
He was born in Lancashire, England on Christmas Day,  December 25, 1830.

A former engineer, he sailed to San Francisco aboard the Mary Francis, arriving on December 20, 1848 and arrived before the Gold Rush. Lees was first hired by the San Francisco Police Department in 1854 and promoted to Captain in 1858. He served continuously forty-seven years, retiring in January 1900. He eventually became Captain of Detectives and served as Chief of Police of San Francisco from 1897 to 1900, and later as Police Commissioner. As a criminal officer, he traveled to Scotland Yard several times and his picture hangs there, representing one of the great criminal officers of his day. It was Captain Lees who founded the Rogues Gallery, using his own money to make the original collection of pictures. 

He died on December 21, 1902 in San Francisco, California, president of the Veteran Police Association. He and his wife had five children, two of whom survived him.

References

Further reading
 William B. Secrest. Dark and Tangled Threads of Crime: San Francisco's Famous Police Detective Isaiah W. Lees. Word Dancer Press, 2004. 
 Ethington, Philip J., Vigilantes and the Police: The Creation of a Professional Police Bureaucracy in San Francisco. 1847 - 1900 Journal of Social History, 21:2 (1987:Winter) p. 197
 Isaiah W. Lees Collection, 1863-1903, California State Archives

External links
 

1830 births
1902 deaths
American police detectives
San Francisco Police Department chiefs